The Circling Hour is a progressive rock album by Iona, released in 2006. It marked a return to the studio for the band after a break of nearly six years to record a full album.

Track listing

"Empyrean Dawn" – 7:49
"Children of Time" – 5:33
"Strength" – 5:59
"Wind off the Lake"  – 11:02
"Factory of Magnificent Souls" – 5:02
"Sky Maps" – 6:39
"No Fear in Love"   – 5:59
"Wind, Water & Fire - Wind" – 3:30
"Wind, Water & Fire - Water" – 3:00
"Wind, Water & Fire - Fire" – 7:14
"Fragments of a Fiery Sun" – 2:45

Personnel

Band
 Joanne Hogg - lead and backing vocals, choir chorus, keyboards
 Dave Bainbridge - electric and acoustic guitars, keyboards, bouzouki, choir voices, Hammond organ, wind chimes, high-strung acoustic and electric guitars, mandolin, piano, e-bow guitars
 Troy Donockley - Uilleann pipes, low and high whistles, tofran, bouzouki, vocals, choir voices, e-bow guitar, slide guitar
 Frank Van Essen - drums, bodhran, shaker, violin, choir voices, darabukkas, finger cymbals, tambourine, djembe, drum pads, tom toms, violas
 Phil Barker - bass guitar

Additional musician and special guest
Heather Findlay - vocals (on" Fragments of a Fiery Sun")

Production
Recorded between July 2005 and March 2006 at Open Sky Studio, Lincolnshire, England, and Studio Frank van Essen, Drachten, Holland
Additional recording at Waterworld, Yorkshire, England
Hammond organ and piano recorded at Chapel Studios, Lincolnshire, England (engineer Will Bartle)
Digital transfers made at DB Studios, Lincoln, England 
Recorded by Dave Bainbridge, Frank van Essen and Troy Donockley
Produced by Dave Bainbridge
Mixed by John Kellogg with Dave Bainbridge and Troy Donockley, at Immergent Studios, Los Angeles
Mastered by Denis Blackham, Isle of Skye, Scotland

Release details
2006, UK, Open Sky Records OPENVP11CD, release date September 2006, CD

References

External links
 

Iona (band) albums
2006 albums